The South Darwin Rabbitohs are a semi-professional Rugby league club based in Marrara, Northern Territory. They play home games at TIO Stadium. They won one premiership in 2003 by beating the Darwin Brothers 51-50.

See also

List of rugby league clubs in Australia
List of rugby union clubs in Australia
Rugby league in the Northern Territory
List of sports clubs inspired by others

References

External links

Sport in Darwin, Northern Territory
Australian rugby union teams
Rugby league teams in the Northern Territory
Rugby clubs established in 1976
1976 establishments in Australia
Rugby union in the Northern Territory